Vision Capital is an international investor with a flexible capital approach to investing in mid-size private companies that has its headquarters in Western Europe and North America.

The company specializes in both the dynamics of private equity funds and the strategic development of companies. It also specializes in purchasing groups of companies from buyout firms. The firm has developed a number of investment structures.

Vision Capital has completed 16 transactions and has acquired 49 companies in a variety of sectors. The firm was founded by Julian Mash and has offices in London and New York.

Its portfolio includes a range of companies acquired from banks, corporates and private equity firms. The firm has invested in a wide range of sectors including Financial Services, Industrials and Consumer.

In 2016, the company announced that it had shifted its investment strategy to focus on private debt investments amid a change in deal flow.

References

External links 

Private equity firms
Financial services companies established in 1997